Pepo was an 11th-century consultant judge ("causidicus") who became the first law teacher at the University of Bologna.  His teaching was based on Justinian's compilations of Roman law, including the Code, Institutes, and Digest.

Notes

11th-century Italian jurists
11th-century Italian writers